is a Japanese football player for Nara Club. His father is Satoshi Tsunami currently manager of Briobecca Urayasu.

Career statistics

Club
Updated to the start 2023 season.

References

External links

Profile at Nagano Parceiro
Profile at Nara Club

1992 births
Living people
Kansai University alumni
Association football people from Tokyo
Japanese footballers
J3 League players
Japan Football League players
AC Nagano Parceiro players
Nara Club players
Association football defenders